Negative air ionization therapy (NAIs) uses air ionisers as a non-pharmaceutical treatment for respiratory disease, allergy, or stress-related health conditions. The mainstream scientific community considers many applications of NAIs to be pseudoscience. Many negative ion products release ozone, a chemical known to cause lung damage.

Research 
For Seasonal Affective Disorder (SAD), a randomized controlled trial (RCT) comparing high (4.5x1014 ions/second) and low (1.7x1011 ions/second) flow rate negative air ionization with bright light therapy found that the post-treatment improvement percentage was 57.1% for bright light, 47.9% for high-density ions and 22.7% for low-density ions. An older RCT conducted by the same authors also found air ionization effective for SAD. A 2007 review considers this therapy "under investigation" and suggests that it may be a helpful treatment for SAD.

An RCT comparing the short-term effects of bright light, an auditory stimulus, and high and low-density negative ions on mood and alertness in mildly depressed and non-depressed adults found that the three first (active) stimuli, but not the low-density placebo, reduced depression on the Beck Depression Inventory scale. The auditory stimulus, bright light, and high-density ions all produced rapid mood changes - with small to medium effect sizes - in depressed and non-depressed subjects.

A 2008 clinical trial showed that negative ion generators produced a smaller percentage of change on SIGH SAD compared to LED photo-therapy. A separate randomized placebo-controlled study published in May 2010 found that the difference between high-density ion therapy and placebo (dim red light and low-density ions) was not statistically significant. The study concluded that bright white light therapy was significantly more effective than negative ion therapy for treating SAD.

Researchers have continued to cite a dearth of evidence about the effects of negative air ionization. "The presence of NAIs is credited for increasing psychological health, productivity, and overall well-being but without consistent or reliable evidence in therapeutic effects and with controversy in anti-microorganisms," researchers wrote in a 2018 article published in the International Journal of Molecular Sciences.

While that 2018 study concludes that negative ion therapy has no measurable therapeutic effects, and it is considered to be pseudoscience by this and previous studies, other studies conclude there are beneficial effects on cognition and mood.

See also
 Topics characterized as pseudoscience
 Ionized bracelet
 Earthing therapy
 Water ionizer

References

Alternative medicine